Walsingham Rural District was a rural district in the county of Norfolk, England. It was created in 1894. On 1 April 1935 it was enlarged by the addition of the parishes of Hindolveston, Thurning, Wood Norton (from the disbanded Aylsham Rural District) and Briston (from the Erpingham Rural District). On 1 April 1974 it was abolished under the Local Government Act 1972, and has since formed part of the District of North Norfolk.

Statistics

Parishes

References

Historical districts of Norfolk
Districts of England abolished by the Local Government Act 1972
Walsingham